The 2011 Vanderbilt Commodores baseball team represented Vanderbilt University in the 2011 NCAA Division I baseball season.  The team played its home games at Hawkins Field in Nashville, Tennessee.  The team was coached by Tim Corbin in his ninth season at Vanderbilt.

The Commodores reached the 2011 College World Series, falling in the semifinals to runner-up Florida.

Regionals

The Commodores were announced as a host for the Nashville regional, which featured #6 national seed Vanderbilt, Oklahoma State, Troy, and fellow Nashville university Belmont. Vanderbilt marched through the regional, defeating 4 seed Belmont 10–0, 3 seed Troy 10–2, and Belmont again in the final by the score of 6–1. A year later, Vanderbilt coach Josh Holliday would become the head coach of his alma mater and 2011 regional participant, Oklahoma State University.

In the SuperRegional, Vanderbilt drew the winner of the Corvallis regional, Oregon State. With first-round draft pick Sonny Gray on the mound, the Commodores jumped out to a quick 4–0 lead in the first before coasting to an 11–1 win. Mike Yastrzemski hit a three-run home run in the 4th inning.

The second game of the series also went the way of the Commodores, led by first baseman Aaron Westlake's three home runs. Vanderbilt defeated the Beavers 9–3 to punch their first to the College World Series, the first in the history of the school.

Personnel

Roster

Coaches

Schedule

Ranking Movements

References

Vanderbilt
Vanderbilt Commodores baseball seasons
College World Series seasons
Vanderbilt
Vanderbilt Commodores baseball